Tamana is a non-profit voluntary organization registered during 1984 in India, consisting of three special education centers, a training cell and a research center to support individuals with intellectual and developmental disabilities. The organization's work is recognized by the Ministry of Social Justice and Empowerment, Government of India, Government of Delhi, Rehabilitation Council of India and is registered with the National Trust. Tamana also has a Special Consultative Status within the United Nations Economic and Social Council since 2005.

The organization’s founder, Dr. Shayama Chona, was awarded the Padmashree, a Padmabhushan and two national awards for her contributions in the disability sector in India.

Aim and vision

Tamana offers an individual educational program for every student, aimed at social and economic independence, which incorporates special education, a regular academic program through the NIOS, therapeutic interventions and vocational training. Each Centre of Tamana offers speech, occupational therapy and physiotherapy, life skills training, computer education, music and dance, weight management and physical fitness, sports and extracurricular activities, counseling, behaviour modification, diagnostics and assessment facilities, and family counseling.

Under the cherished dream of seeing each child become an independent adult, the aims of the organization include:

• Providing therapy and counseling to children and their families.

• Maintaining a motivated, dedicated and quality conscious team of professionals.

• Contributing to the training and development of manpower in the field of special education.

• Providing legal advocacy services.

• Introducing relevant technology to enhance the effectiveness of special education.

• Conducting research in key areas of special education and training.

• Creating and enhancing greater public awareness, understanding and acceptance of people with
special needs.

• Networking with organizations worldwide.

Special Schools

Tamana Special School

The first branch of Tamana, the Tamana Special School, was inaugurated by the late Lady Diana, the Princess of Wales, on 12 February 1992 and the foundation stone was laid by the then High Commissioner of Britain, Sir David Goodall. The Special School caters to the individual needs of 115 children coming from all strata of the society, ranging in age from 4 to 17. This school focuses on overall development of the child, depending on needs as well as potential. Functional academics are imparted with parallel intervention with allied therapies depending on the needs of the child. The regular school curriculum is a vital reference point for students who have potential to be included in a regular classroom or join the open school program.

Nai Disha Vocational Center

With the realization that the young adults at Tamana have to be equipped with skills to adapt appropriately to the needs of adulthood and thereby function as an independent whole, physically and emotionally, Nai Disha was conceived. The program aims to create an infrastructure which ensures a smooth graduation from school to the outside world, for the young adult and the family. It also aims to ensure training and placements of young adults in various vocations and organizations.

Major skills targeted include:
 Textiles printing
 Office skill management
 Paper bag and envelope making
 Paper recycling 
 Clay modeling
 Baking
 File making 
 Candle making
 Basic home management skills of cooking and baking 
 Computer skills training
 Stationery production - making greeting cards, envelopes, writing pads, file folders
 Gardening
 Beauty culture
 Tailoring

Tamana School of Hope

Tamana was the first institution in India to recognize autism as a disability distinct from others and to start programs for autistic spectrum disorder in 1985. The Autism Center - School of Hope is India's first rehabilitation and research center for autistic individuals, providing holistic services under one roof – a special school, sensory integration clinic, early intervention center, diagnostic center, research cell and outreach cell.
 His Excellency Dr. A.P.J. Abdul Kalam,  former president of India, inaugurated the School of Hope, a full-fledged school dedicated to children with autism, on 19 August 2003.

The highlights of the program offered are:
 A life centered approach to curriculum planning to meet the needs of child and family
 Approaches on which intervention for the autistic is based are TEACCH and ABA (with small groups of students) 
 Sensory integration therapy 
 Computers with latest software are regularly used for overall development of the students
 Music and dance therapy
 Yoga and sports
 The students are taught to make beds, arrange clothes in cupboards, personal grooming, washing clothes, cooking
 Vocational training for youth above 16 years of age, including jewelry design, greeting card making and gardening

Teacher Training Cell
Tamana has been recognized as a special study center by the Rehabilitation Council of India and IGNOU since 1994. The courses offered are:
 Post Graduate Professional Diploma in Special Education
 Post Graduate Professional certificate in Special Education
 B.Ed. in Special Education 
 D.Ed. SE Diploma in Education Special Education (ASD - Autism Spectrum Disorders)

Research

Tamana, in collaboration with Deakin University, Australia, launched TOBY (Therapy Outcomes by You) Playpad Laboratory on 5 July 2013 at its Autism Center, School of Hope. TOBY is an iPad-based, therapist-and-parent application for early intervention therapy with children with autism.

In association with Deakin University, Australia for TOBY, Tamana won the  Victorian International Education Award for Excellence in International Education – Research Engagement in 2013.

Fundraising 
Tamana organizes annual fashion shows as part of its fundraising. Leading fashion designers of the country have participated in the show, including Manish Arora, Rajesh Pratap Singh, Ritu Kumar, Suneet Varma, Mira and Muzzaffar Ali, J.J. Vallaya, Satya Paul, Abhishek Gupta and Nandita Basu, Namrata Joshipura, Rohit Gandhi + Rahul Khanna. Students from the Tamana Special Schools walk the ramp hand in hand, shoulder to shoulder with the professional models.
 The objective of the event is to create and ensure public awareness, understanding and acceptance of people with special needs.

Tamana organizes its annual winter carnival for showcasing the products developed by the students with special needs and for providing a platform to market them. The aim of the event is to create awareness about the disabled and to promote their social integration.

Honours, awards and recognition

 Tamana was given the National Award for Best Institution for Child Welfare by Department of Women and Child Development, Government of India. The award was presented by Hon'ble Minister for Women and Child Development Mrs Krishna Tirath on 23 January in her office at Shastri Bhawan. 
 The first Mother Teresa Award (Nov. 1997) was presented to Tamana Special School for its dedicated services to the mentally impaired.
 Dr. Shyama Chona, President of Tamana, received the National Award for the Welfare Of People With Disabilities for the year 1997. It was an appreciation of years of struggle in the field of disability at a personal and institutional level for her.
 NGO in Special Consultative Status with United Nations' Economic and Social Council, 2005.
 National Award for Best Institution for Child Welfare 2006 from the Ministry of Women and Child Development, Government of India.
 Award for the Most Innovative Project Implementation in 2007 presented at the round table organised on Global Partnerships In Poverty Eradication and Health Care, organised as part of annual ministerial review innovation fair (Asia) - an initiative of NGO DESA - United Nations Economic and Social Council and  Mumbai Educational Trust.

References

External links
 Official Website
 Heartspring, US
 National Autistic Society, UK
 Nai Disha School
 Tamana Research
 Tamana and Princess Diana

Autism-related organisations in India
Organizations established in 1984
Disability organisations based in India
Organisations based in Delhi
Schools in Delhi
Special schools in India